Ocean Club is a Gabonese football club based in Tchibanga, Gabon.

The club currently plays in Gabon Championnat National D1

Stadium
Currently the team plays at the 1,000 capacity Stade Dialogue.

League participations
 Gabon Championnat National D1: 2013–
 Gabon Second Division: ????–2013

External links
 
 Soccerway

Football clubs in Gabon